Dreamtime is a 1997 role-playing game supplement for CORPS published by Blacksburg Tactical Research Center.

Contents
Dreamtime is a supplement which details an aboriginal setting in which the player characters are hunter gatherers.

Reception
Cliff Ramshaw reviewed Dreamtime for Arcane magazine, rating it an 8 out of 10 overall. Ramshaw comments that "Only referees prepared to work hard and put in plenty of imagination need apply. Those that do will discover something rare and thought-provoking."

References

Campaign settings
Role-playing game books
Role-playing game supplements introduced in 1997